Sambhar Lake Town railway station is  in Jaipur district, Rajasthan. Its code is SBR. It serves Sambhar Lake Town and station consists of two platforms. Nearest junction is

Major trains 

Some of the important trains that runs from Sambhar Lake Town are :

54811/54812 Bhopal–Jodhpur Express connects the town with Jaipur, Kota, Bhopal, Sawai Madhopur, Makrana, Degana etc.
14853/14854/14863/14864 Varanasi–Jodhpur Marudhar Express connects the city with Varanasi, Lucknow, Agra, Jaipur etc.
22981/22982 Kota–Sri Ganganagar Express from Kota via. Bikaner to Sri Ganganagar via. Suratgarh
12467/12468 Leelan Express from  Jaisalmer to Jaipur via Merta Road, Bikaner, Lalgarh, etc.
 59705 /59706 Suratgarh–Jaipur Fast Passenger vai. Phulera, Makrana, Medta Road, Nagour, Bikaner, etc.

References

Railway stations in Jaipur district
Jodhpur railway division